Chen Wu is a character in the classical Chinese fantasy novel Fengshen Yanyi.

Chen Wu is the commander of Through-Clouds-Pass and the elder brother of Chen Tong. At the time of Chen Tong's death, smoke signals were set off from High-Water-Pass that were instantly seen at Chen Wu's pass. Now knowing the death of his brother, Chen Wu realizes that Huang Feihu will soon reach his pass and that it would be best to use wit to kill Huang Feihu—rather than brute force.

Upon Huang Feihu's arrival, Chen Wu calmly invites him and his entourage into his garrison compound for food and rest. In short time, Huang Feihu and his men are lavished with wine and food, thus enjoying their time. During the night, Huang Feihu heard from his late wife that he is in Chen Wu's trap. Before the firewood around their sleeping quarters could be activated, Huang Feihu sliced through the walls and escaped with his entourage. Chen Wu gave due haste but was cut down in a short time by Huang Feihu's prowess.

Chen Wu was appointed as the deity of Yuexing Star (月刑星) in the end.

Notes

References
Fengshen Yanyi, chapter 32, pages 330-331

Investiture of the Gods characters